Robert Wayne Prehoda (July 7, 1931 - June 11, 2009) was an American chemist and futurist. He participated in the first cryonic suspension of a human being, that of James Bedford. He had a wife, Aline.

Works
 What are the effects of current automation trends in the oil industry on management, unions and the employees?, University of Tulsa, 1957
 Technological forecasting methodology, 1966
 Designing the future: the role of technological forecasting, Chilton Book Co., 1967
 Extended youth: the promise of gerontology, Putnam, 1968
 Suspended animation: the research possibility that may allow man to conquer the limiting chains of time, Chilton Book Co., 1969
 Your Next Fifty Years, Penguin Group (USA) Incorporated, 1980

References

External links
 Interview with Prehoda, Cryonics Reports, Vol. 4, No. 1, January 1969
 "Alcohol as Fuel" (letter to the editor), Science News, Vol. 100, No. 6 (Aug. 7, 1971), p. 88

1931 births
Futurologists
Cryonics
2009 deaths